The 2011 Durand Cup is the 124th edition of the Durand Cup, the third oldest association football competition in the world.
Churchill Brothers won the 2011 Durand Cup at the Ambedkar Stadium with a 5–4 tie-break win over Prayag United. The 2010 Durand Cup Champions were Prayag United.

Background

Format
The Durand Cup is scheduled from 24 September to 15 October 2011. The tournament will be conducted in two stages. Stage 1 will be the Qualifying Knock Out Round and Stage 2 will be Quarter Final League round.

I-League Clubs Leaving
I-League clubs Mohun Bagan, Dempo, Mumbai, HAL and East Bengal have decided to skip the tournament for various reasons like having to play in other tournaments, to prepare for the I-League or they just don't see worth in the cup.

Game Ball
COSCO Platina FIFA approved football is the {official ball of the tournament.

Award Money
The cash award for the Winner, Runners up and the 3rd positions will be awarded with Rs. 20 Lakhs, 10 Lakhs and 5 Lakhs respectively.

Fixtures

First round
The Durand Cup officially started on 24 September 2011 with Delhi United FC beating MEG Bangalore 2–0. Then the second match of the day took place with Assam Rifles demolishing State Bank of Hyderabad 5–1. The next day ARC Shillong beat State Bank of Travancore 2-1 while Indian Air Force beat Shahadra FC 4–3 on penalties after drawing 0-0. Then on 26 September BSF FC beat J&K Bank Football Club 4–3 on penalties after drawing 1-1. Then Bhawanipore FC beat Army Green 3–1 on penalties after drawing 0-0. Then on 27 September Indian Navy FC defeated FC Punjab Police 1-0 while Army Jr FC lost to CRPF 2–1. Then on 28 September BSF FC defeated Bhawanipore FC on penalties 5-3 after drawing 1-1. Then Delhi United FC lost 4–2 to Assam Rifles. Meanwhile, on 30 September BSF beat Tata Football Academy 2–0.

Group stage
All matches will be played in Delhi

Group A

Group B

Group C

Group D

SemiFinals

Finals

References

Durand Cup seasons
2011–12 in Indian football
2011 domestic association football cups